
Gmina Dolice is a rural gmina (administrative district) in Stargard County, West Pomeranian Voivodeship, in north-western Poland.

Villages
Gmina Dolice contains the villages and settlements of Boguszyce, Bralęcin, Brzezina, Dobropole Pyrzyckie, Dolice, Kolin, Komorowo, Krępcewo, Lipka, Mogilica, Morzyca, Moskorzyn, Płoszkowo, Pomietów, Przewłoki, Rzeplino, Sądów, Sądówko, Skrzany, Strzebielewo, Szemielino, Trzebień, Warszyn, Żalęcino, Ziemomyśl A and Ziemomyśl B.

Neighbouring gminas
Gmina Dolice is bordered by the gminas of Barlinek, Choszczno, Pełczyce, Przelewice, Stargard, Suchań and Warnice.

References
Polish official population figures 2006

Dolice
Stargard County